Mike or Michael Atkinson may refer to:

Michael Atkinson (composer), Australian songwriter and musician since 1975
Michael Atkinson (politician) (born 1958), South Australian MP
Michael Atkinson (writer) (born 1962), American poet and film critic
Michael Atkinson (Inspector General) (born 1964), American Intelligence Community official
Mike Atkinson (born 1994), English footballer